Lihesten or Lifjellet is a  tall mountain in Hyllestad Municipality in Vestland county, Norway. The mountain lies on a small peninsula between the Hyllestadfjorden and the Sognefjorden and it is the highest point in the municipality. It was the site of the Havørn Accident on 16 June 1936.

See also
List of mountains of Norway

References

Mountains of Vestland
Hyllestad